Francisco Pereira da Costa Júnior (born June 17, 1977), known as Júnior Maranhão, is a Brazilian football player.

Career
Júnior Maranhão played for Sergipe in the Campeonato Sergipano and Campeonato Brasileiro Série B.

Club statistics

References

External links

1985 births
Living people
Brazilian footballers
Brazilian expatriate footballers
Santa Cruz Futebol Clube players
Oita Trinita players
Sport Club do Recife players
Campinense Clube players
Salgueiro Atlético Clube players
Marília Atlético Clube players
Figueirense FC players
Rio Branco Esporte Clube players
Mirassol Futebol Clube players
Club Sportivo Sergipe players
Expatriate footballers in Japan
J1 League players
Association football midfielders